The Men's 1500 metres competition at the 2021 World Single Distances Speed Skating Championships was held on 14 February 2021.

Results
The race was started at 13:36.

References

Men's 1500 metres